Finikas Ayias Marinas Chrysochous is a Cypriot professional football club based in Ayia Marina Chrysochous, Paphos District, Cyprus. It was founded in 1973, and is currently playing in the STOK Elite Division, Cypriot fourth division.

References 
https://www.cfa.com.cy/En/roster/12601716/55255
https://us.soccerway.com/teams/cyprus/foinikas-agia-marina/24869/

Football clubs in Cyprus
Association football clubs established in 1973
1973 establishments in Cyprus